T. Krishnan, popularly known as Kavithalayaa Krishnan, is an Indian actor known for playing supporting roles in Tamil film and television. He is a regular artist in many K. Balachander's films and television serials produced by Kavithalayaa Productions and Kavithalayaa got along as his name.

Career
Kavithalayaa Krishnan has acted in over 120 films, 60 television serials and made over 2500 stage appearances. He was awarded Kalaimamani (2005) by Government of Tamil Nadu. He started acting in stage plays along with Crazy Mohan who was his classmate when he did his engineering at College of Engineering, Guindy. He made his film debut in Poikkal Kudhirai (1983), a remake of Crazy Mohan's play Marriage made in Saloon directed by K. Balachander.

Partial filmography

 Poikkal Kudhirai (1983)
 Sindhu Bhairavi (1985)
 Manathil Uruthi Vendum (1987)
 Dharmathin Thalaivan (1988)
 Sathyaa (1988)
 Apoorva Sagodharargal (1989)
 Indrudu Chandrudu (1989)
 Keladi Kanmani (1990)
 Oru Veedu Iru Vasal (1990)
 Anjali (1990)
 Azhagan (1991)
 Idhayam (1991)
 Vaaname Ellai (1992)
 Annamalai (1992)
 Vedan (1993)
 Jaathi Malli (1993)
 Chinna Mapillai (1993)
 Duet (1994)
 Pattukottai Periyappa (1994)
 Sathi Leelavathi (1995)
 Paattu Padava (1995)
 Engirundho Vandhan (1995)
 Baashha (1995)
 Avvai Shanmughi (1996)
 Nerrukku Ner (1997)
 Ratchagan (1997)
 Santhosham (1998)
 Thulli Thirintha Kaalam (1998)
 Natpukkaga (1998)
 Harichandra (1998)
 Suyamvaram (1999)
 Paarthale Paravasam (2001)
 Majunu (2001)
 Pammal K. Sambandam (2002)
 Yai! Nee Romba Azhaga Irukke! (2002)
 Shree (2002)
 Vasool Raja MBBS (2004)
 Ayya (2005)
 Idhaya Thirudan (2006)
 Thozha (2008)
 Kuselan (2008)
 Dasavathaaram (2008)
 Ilaignan (2011)
 Eththan (2011)
 Aarohanam (2012)
 Thegidi (2014)
 Strawberry (2015)
 Vai Raja Vai (2015)
 Sawaari (2016)
 Kannula Kaasa Kattappa (2016)
 Kanavu Variyam (2017)
 Thiruttu Payale 2 (2017)
 Irumbu Thirai (2018)
 96 (2018)
 Mei (2019)
 House Owner (2019)
 Adutha Saattai (2019)
 Payanigal Gavanikkavum (2022)
 Veetla Vishesham (2022)
Gargi (2022)
Vendhu Thanindhathu Kaadu (2022)

Television

Web series

References

External links
 

Living people
Year of birth missing (living people)
Tamil male actors
Tamil male television actors
College of Engineering, Guindy alumni
Recipients of the Kalaimamani Award
Indian male television actors
Indian male film actors
Male actors in Tamil cinema